Héctor Acosta Quintero (born 24 November 1991) is a Mexican footballer who plays as a right back for Venados.

Honours
Santos Laguna
Liga MX: Clausura 2015
Campeon de Campeones: 2015

References

External links
 
 

1991 births
Living people
Footballers from Jalisco
Association football defenders
Mexico under-20 international footballers
Deportivo Toluca F.C. players
Santos Laguna footballers
Alebrijes de Oaxaca players
Venados F.C. players
Atlético San Luis footballers
Liga MX players
Ascenso MX players
Mexican footballers